Shack is the surname of:

 Eddie Shack (born 1937), Canadian retired National Hockey League player
 Joe Shack (1915–1987), Canadian National Hockey League player
 Peter Shack (born 1953), Australian retired politician
 Ruth Shack (born 1931), American human rights activist